Park Ji-soo is a Korean name consisting of the family name Park and the given name Ji-soo (Ji-su). It may refer to:

 Park Ji-soo (footballer) (born 1994)
 Park Ji-soo (actress) (born 1988)
 Park Ji-hyo (born 1997), birth name Park Ji-soo, singer of Twice
 Park Ji-su (born 1998), member of the South Korea women's national basketball team
 Jisu Park (born 1990), StarCraft player
NIve (singer) (born 1993)